Tracy Austin and Kim Clijsters were the defending champions, but chose not to participate together. Austin played alongside Lindsay Davenport, but they were eliminated in the round robin competition. Clijsters teamed up with Nathalie Tauziat, but were defeated in the final by Nathalie Dechy and Amélie Mauresmo, 6–7(4–7), 6–4, [15–13].

Draw

Final

Group A
Standings are determined by: 1. number of wins; 2. number of matches; 3. in three-players-ties, percentage of sets won, or of games won; 4. steering-committee decision.

Group B
Standings are determined by: 1. number of wins; 2. number of matches; 3. in three-players-ties, percentage of sets won, or of games won; 4. steering-committee decision.

References
Main Draw

Women's Legends Doubles